Narlu (also Romanized as Narlū; also known as Narlī and Tūlī) is a village in Sanjabad-e Shomali Rural District, in the Central District of Kowsar County, Ardabil Province, Iran. At the 2006 census, its population was 69, in 15 families.

References 

Tageo

Towns and villages in Kowsar County